Santiago Aldama Alesón (born 7 December 1968) is a Spanish former professional basketball player. He competed in the men's tournament at the 1992 Summer Olympics.

He is the father of current NBA player Santi Aldama.

References

External links
 

1968 births
Living people
Basketball players at the 1992 Summer Olympics
CB Gran Canaria players
CB Inca players
CB Peñas Huesca players
CB Valladolid players
CB Zaragoza players
Club Ourense Baloncesto players
FC Porto basketball players
Liga ACB players
Olympic basketball players of Spain
Spanish expatriate sportspeople in Portugal
Spanish men's basketball players
Centers (basketball)